Nancy Anne Parsons (January 17, 1942  – January 5, 2001) was an American actress.

Early years
Parsons grew up in Lake Minnetonka, Minnesota and was a member of the Class of 1960 at Minnetonka High School.

Career
Parsons resumed acting in 1974 after taking 10 years off to raise a family with two children. She starred as Miss Amelia Evans in Edward Albee's stage version of The Ballad of the Sad Café and received the top prize in the Hugh O'Brian Acting Awards at UCLA. She also went on to act at Theatre East in Studio City.

Parsons's film debut came in I Never Promised You a Rose Garden (1977). She portrayed Beulah Balbricker in the 1982 film Porky's and its sequels, as well as Ida in Motel Hell (1980).

Parsons made guest appearances in several TV shows, including Remington Steele, Baretta, Charlie's Angels, The Rockford Files, Lou Grant, Family Ties, and Star Trek: The Next Generation.

Death
Parsons died January 5, 2001, in La Crosse, Wisconsin, aged 58.

Filmography

Television
 Star Trek: The Next Generation — episode "The Vengeance Factor" as Marouk (1989)
 Charlie's Angels — episode "Angels in Springtime" as Zora Stafford (1978)
 Days of Our Lives - 27 episodes, Mary Brooke/Nurse Jackson (1994–1996)

References

External links
 
 

1942 births
2001 deaths
20th-century American actresses
American film actresses
American television actresses
Deaths from diabetes